Priyanka Roy (born 2 March 1988) is an Indian cricketer.

A right-handed batter and leg break bowler, she played 27 One Day Internationals and 15 Twenty20 Internationals for the India Women's team. Her performances at the 2009 Women's Cricket World Cup saw her named in the ICC's team of the tournament.

References

External links

1988 births
Living people
Cricketers from Kolkata
Sportswomen from Kolkata
Indian women cricketers
India women One Day International cricketers
India women Twenty20 International cricketers
Seth Anandram Jaipuria College alumni
University of Calcutta alumni
Central Zone women cricketers
East Zone women cricketers
Railways women cricketers
Bengal women cricketers